Puritipenta is located in Gajapathinagaram Mandal/Tehsil of Vizianagaram District in Andhra Pradesh State, India.

Demographics 
In this village population of children with age 0-6 is 836 which makes up 10.40% of total population of village. Average Sex Ratio of this village is 1038 which is higher than the state average of 993. Child Sex Ratio for this village as per census is 926, lower than the state average of 939.
This village has higher literacy rate compared to the state literacy rate . In 2011, literacy rate of this village was 77.59% compared to 67.02% of the State . In this village Male literacy stands at 85.19% while female literacy rate was 70.37%. 

In this village out of total population, 2911 were engaged in work activities. 92.41% of workers describe their work as Main Work (Employment or Earning more than 6 Months) while 7.59% were involved in Marginal activity providing livelihood for less than 6 months. Of 2911 workers engaged in Main Work, 286 were cultivators (owner or co-owner) while 625 were Agricultural labourer.

Census of India, assigned the following codes to identify each village uniquely. Census codes for this village are as follows:

According to the 2011, the details of this village are as follows:

Caste Factor 
Schedule Caste (SC) constitutes 8.31% while Schedule Tribe (ST) were 2.56% of total population in this village.

Political Information 
As per constitution of India and Panchayati Raaj Act, this village is administrated by Sarpanch (Head of Village) who is elected representative of village.  At present, Mr. Mandala Suresh is the Sarpanch of this Village.  He was elected as Sarpanch in 2014 elections.

References

Villages in Vizianagaram district